Elisabet Llargués Masachs (born 23 October 1980, in Barcelona) is a Spanish sailor. She won the Spanish championship in the Europe (dinghy) class in 2008 and 2010. In 2010, she was world champion in the European class. She took part in the 2007 European Sailing Championships, winning a bronze medal, and in the 2008 Vintage Yachting Games – Europe Female. She is a member of the El Masnou yacht club, and sails Nacra 17 and Laser Radial.

References

External links 
 Official website

1980 births
Living people
Spanish female sailors (sport)
Sailors at the 2016 Summer Olympics – Nacra 17